Lobsang Gyatso (1928–1997) was a Tibetan monk who founded the Institute of Buddhist Dialectics in Delhi, India.

Biography 
Lobsang Gyatso was born in Tibet in the area of Kham in 1928. He became monk at the age of 11 and studied at Drepung monastery.  During the 1959 Tibetan uprising he fled Tibet as part of the Tibetan Exile Community in India.

He founded in 1973 the Institute of Buddhist Dialectics in Dharamsala and in 1991 the College for Higher Tibetan Studies in Sarah, two non-profit educational institutions.

He is the author of several books in Tibetan that were translated in several languages.

Death 
On February 4, 1997, the principal of the Buddhist School of Dialectics, Geshe Lobsang Gyatso was murdered in Dharmasala, along with two of his students. David Kay notes "The subsequent investigation by the Indian police linked the murders to the Dorje Shugden faction of the exiled Tibetan community."

In June 2007, The Times reported that Interpol had issued a Red notice to China for extraditing two of the alleged killers, Lobsang Chodak and Tenzin Chozin.

Robert Thurman notes that the alleged killers had their origin within China as well.

Relation to Shugden practitioners 
Prithvi Raj (PR), Chief Police of Kangra District said: "We have identified two of the murderers, and we have clear indications that the murderers are directly linked to the Dorje Shugden association and directly connecting these murderers with the case. But so far we have not been able to arrest them. One is called Tenzin Chozin, the other is called Lobsang Chodrak. Before the murder, the principal received threatening letters from the Shugden association."

Reincarnation 
In 2006, a nine-year-old boy named Tulku Tsenyi Khentrul Tenzin Tseten Rinpoche was said to be the reincarnation of Lobsang Gyatso by the Dalai Lama.

Bibliography of Lobsang Gyatso 
The Four Noble Truths, Snow Lion Publications, 1994, 
Bodhicitta: Cultivating the Compassionate Mind of Enlightenment, Snow Lion Publications, 1997, 
Memoirs of a Tibetan Lama, Snow Lion Publications, 1998, 
Harmony of Emptiness and Dependent-Arising, Paljor Publications, (LTWA) India, 1992,

References

External links 
Article and Photos of the dead and injured on Dalai Lama's site

Tibetan Murder Mystery par Ted Kerasote
Speech given by Geshe Helmut Gassner, translator to the Dalai Lama, see page 7
Chronology of Events 1997 by the Dorje Shugden Society

Tibetan writers
Gelug Lamas
1928 births
1997 deaths
Tibetan Buddhists from Tibet
20th-century Tibetan people
20th-century lamas
Buddhist monks from Tibet
20th-century Buddhist monks